Regina Sullivan is an American developmental behavioral neuroscientist, a professor of child and adolescent psychiatry at the NYU School of Medicine and senior research scientist in the Emotional Brain Institute at The Nathan Kline Institute for Psychiatric Research.

Life and work 
Sullivan's work focuses on the neurobiology of mother-infant interactions and early life adversity in rodents and humans, and their relationship to life-long psychopathology. Her work brings a diverse set of research tools to these questions including behavior, neuroanatomy, pharmacology, functional imaging, electrophysiology and optogenetics in infant rodents. 

She has been very active in promoting the advancement of women and minorities in STEM throughout her career.

Education and positions 
Sullivan received her Bachelor of Science degree in Experimental Psychology from the City University of New York - Brooklyn College.  She then received her Doctor of Philosophy in Biopsychology from the City University of New York.  After a short post-doctoral position at Duke University, she moved to the University of California at Irvine for additional post-doctoral training with Dr. Michael Leon.  There she rose to the position of assistant research professor in the department of psychobiology (now neurobiology and behavior).

Following her training, she was hired as an assistant professor of psychology at the University of Oklahoma, where she earned tenure and promotion to associate professor.  She then transferred to the Department of Zoology (now Biology) where she became a full professor and was subsequently honored as a presidential professor.  In 2008, she moved to New York City, her hometown, where she now serves as a tenured professor of child and adolescent psychiatry at the NYU School of Medicine and senior research scientist in the Emotional Brain Institute at The Nathan Kline Institute for Psychiatric Research.

Sullivan holds adjunct or affiliated positions at the NYU Center for Neural Science, the University of Oklahoma Biology department, and the Karolinska Institute.  In addition she has held a variety of international visiting academic appointments including at the Université  Claude Bernard, Lyon France, Kochi Medical School, Kochi Japan and the Université de Paris in France.

Research program 
Sullivan’s work has focused on the neurobiology of infant attachment to the mother and the multisensory cues the mother/caregiver provides to the infant to initiate and maintain that attachment. Her early work dissected how maternal odor cues became associated with warmth, tactile stimulation, and milk to drive a learned attraction by the infant (rodent or human) toward the caregiver. Such an attraction is critical for survival of altricial mammals like humans and many rodent infants.  In addition to promoting attraction to the caregiver, these cues can also serve to modulate infant behavioral state. For example, cues from the caregiver can soothe an infant, prepare them for feeding, and reduce fear. However, Sullivan has demonstrated that adverse caregiving during early development can disrupt this caregiver modulation of infant, and lead to long lasting consequences such as impaired social behavior, depression-like symptoms and modified fear learning.  These changes in behavior evoked by adverse rearing are mediated by the amygdala and changes in its dopaminergic inputs.  Her work has been continuously funded by NIH and/or NSF.

Awards and distinctions 
Sullivan has received numerous honors (e.g., Univ. Oklahoma Presidential Professor, Sigma Xi Faculty Research Award, Christopher Clavius Research Award, Fellow of the Eastern Psychological Association, NICHD MERIT award), elected positions (such as president of the International Society for Developmental Psychobiology), and served on multiple committees at NIH and editorial boards.

Publications 

 Sullivan RM, Landers M, Yeaman B and Wilson DA (2000) Good memories of bad events in infancy: Ontogeny of conditioned fear and the amygdala.  Nature, 407:38-39. PMID 10993064, doi:10.1038/35024156 
 Moriceau S and Sullivan RM (2006) Maternal presence serves as a switch between attraction and fear in infancy. Nature Neuroscience, 9:1004-1006. PMCID PMC1560090
 Barr G, Moriceau S, Shionoya K, Muzny K, Gao P and Sullivan RM (2009) Transitions in infant attachment during a sensitive period is modulated by dopamine in the amygdala. Nature Neuroscience, 12:1367-1369. PMCID PMC2783302 
 Karpova N, Pickenhagen A, Lindholm J, TiraboschiE, Kulesskaya N, Ágústsdóttir A, Antila H, Popova D, AkamineY, Bahi A, Sullivan RM, Hen R, Drew L and Castren R (2011) Synergy between antidepressant drug treatment and psychological therapy is required for fear erasure in amygdala. Science, 334:1731-1734. PMCID PMC3929964
 Hostinar CE, Sullivan RM and Gunnar MR (2014) Psychobiological mechanisms underlying the social buffering of the Hypothalamic–Pituitary–Adrenocortical Axis: A review of animal models and human studies across development.  Psychological Bulletin. 140(1):256-282. PMCID PMC3844011
 Tottenham N, Shapiro M, Flannery J, Caldera C, & Sullivan RM (2019) Parental presence switches avoidance to attraction learning in children. Nature Human Behaviour, 3(10):1070-1077. PMCID PMC7218758
 Perry RE, Finegood ED, Braren SH, DeJoseh ML, Putrino DF, Wilson DA, Sullivan RM, Raver CC, Blair C, Family Life Project Key Investigators (2019) Developing a neurobehavioral animal model of poverty: drawing cross-species connections between environments of scarcity-adversity, parenting quality, and infant outcome. Development and Psychopathology, 1-20. PMCID PMC6168440.
 Opendak M, Thiesen E, Blomkvist A, Hollis K, Lint T, Sarro E, Lundström JN, Tottenham N, Dozier M, Wilson DA and Sullivan RM (2020) Adverse caregiving in infancy blunts neural processing of the mother. Nature Communication, 11:1119. PMCID  PMC7048726
 Sullivan RM and Opendak M (2021) Neurobiology of infant fear and anxiety: Impacts of delayed amygdala development and attachment figure quality. Biological Psychiatry, 89(7):641-650. PMCID PMC7914291
 Full Publication List

References 

Year of birth missing (living people)
Living people
American neuroscientists
City University of New York alumni
New York University Grossman School of Medicine faculty